The 2012 season of the FFAS Senior League was the thirty-second season of association football competition in American Samoa. Pago Youth A won the championship, their fourth recorded title and third in a row.

Format
Eight teams competed in the league. The top team became the champion and the bottom two teams must play a play-off match from the Division 2.

Table

References

External links
 Standings at FIFA.com

FFAS Senior League seasons
Amer
football